Kättilstorp is a locality situated in Falköping Municipality, Västergötland, Sweden. It had 253 inhabitants in 2010.

It is known because of the Ryttaren Peat Factory and its light railway.

References 

Populated places in Västra Götaland County
Populated places in Falköping Municipality